Pierre Dumay (21 November 1928 – 22 August 2021) was a French former racing driver.

References

1928 births
2021 deaths
Pieds-Noirs
French racing drivers
24 Hours of Le Mans drivers
Sportspeople from Algiers